Cape Conran (Gunai: Kerlip or Murrow-gunnie) is a locality in far-eastern Victoria, Australia.  It lies within the Cape Conran Coastal Park located between Marlo and Bemm River about 400 km from Melbourne.  The area actually includes two capes: East Cape Conran and West Cape Conran. Both are popular recreational destinations for visitors from nearby towns such as Orbost, as well as further afield, especially in the warmer months.

While there are no permanent dwellings at West Cape, the East Cape area has a manager's house and office in the Banksia Bluff camping area which has about 100 camp sites, cabins and luxury tents for short term stays. At the 2016 census Cape Conran had a population of 4 

Locals have been taking camping holidays at East Cape since at least the early 20th century (Green 1984). From the mid-1940s about a dozen huts were located there, mostly by locals from the Orbost area, to establish what was known as the 'Conran Settlement' or 'Conran Community'. These huts were subject to permissive occupancy laws which were invoked by the State Labor Government to force their removal in 1986.

See also 
 SS Ridge Park

References

External links 

 Green, O.S. (1984) Marlo: The Town, the Plains, the Cape. Acacia Press, Blackburn, Victoria.

Towns in Victoria (Australia)
Shire of East Gippsland